Francis Patrick Roach (19 May 1937 – 17 July 2004) was an English professional wrestler, martial artist and actor. During an acting career between the 1970s and the 1990s, he appeared in multiple films; due to his large size usually cast as a henchman. He appeared in the Indiana Jones film series, as the West Country bricklayer Brian "Bomber" Busbridge in the 1980s British television series Auf Wiedersehen, Pet, and in the role of Petty Officer Edgar Evans in the television production The Last Place on Earth.

Early life
Roach was born and brought up in Birmingham, West Midlands, the son of Francis "Frank" Roach (born 1905). He was National Judo Champion in 1960, and Midland Area Black Belt Champion in 1962.

Sports career
 
Roach boxed as an amateur before becoming professional as a protege of Jack Solomons.

He began his professional wrestling career under the name of "Judo" Pat Roach. After his acting career had begun, he continued to wrestle under the name of "Bomber" Pat Roach, having previously been billed as "Big" Pat Roach before receiving affectionate cheering from the audience. He was trained by Alf Kent, his first official wrestling match was against George Selko in 1960. Roach held both the British and European heavyweight championships at one time.

Acting career
Roach made his acting debut as the red-bearded bouncer in the Korova Milkbar in Stanley Kubrick's A Clockwork Orange. He worked on another Kubrick film, Barry Lyndon, where he played a hand-to-hand brawler named Toole who engages Ryan O'Neal in a fistfight. Roach went on to play a number of strong-man supporting character roles in films in the 1970s, 80s, and 90s, including the nonspeaking role of Hephaestus in Clash of the Titans.

Pat cameoed as a SPECTRE assassin in the 'unofficial' James Bond film Never Say Never Again, and as bandit-warlord Lord Brytag in the sword-and-sorcery film Red Sonja. He appeared as the skull-helmeted General Kael in the film Willow; the evil wizard Thoth-Amon in Conan the Destroyer and as the Celtic chieftain in Robin Hood: Prince of Thieves.

In 1985 he played Petty Officer Edgar Evans in the Central TV serial The Last Place on Earth about Captain Scott's expedition to the South Pole. Roach was turned down as Darth Vader in Star Wars; however, its director, George Lucas, subsequently cast him as several burly villains in the Indiana Jones film series in the 1980s. In Raiders of the Lost Ark, he played two roles: the first being a giant Sherpa who fights Jones in the bar in Nepal, the second being a German Luftwaffe mechanic who fistfights with Jones before being killed by an aircraft's propeller blades on the airstrip in Egypt. In the next film, Indiana Jones and the Temple of Doom, Roach played a Thuggee guard in a mine who fights with Jones before being killed in a rock crusher. His final appearance in the series was as a Gestapo officer in Indiana Jones and the Last Crusade, he appears only briefly as the character's fight with Jones was cut because director Steven Spielberg considered the scene "too long" and served as a subplot.

On television Roach played the down-to-earth and easy going Brian "Bomber" Busbridge in the long running comedy-drama Auf Wiedersehen, Pet. He appeared in all four series, but was absent from the final two-part Christmas special.

Personal life

Roach married Doreen Harris in 1957. They had a son and a daughter.

In the 1990s, Roach owned and co-managed a scrapyard in Saltley, Birmingham. He also ran a gym on Gravelly Hill North, Erdington, in North-East Birmingham.

Roach died on 17 July 2004 of esophageal cancer. His body was buried in Bromsgrove Cemetery, Worcestershire.

Filmography

Film

Television

Championships and accomplishments
Joint Promotions
British Heavyweight Championship (once)
European Heavyweight Championship (twice)

Premier Promotions|Premier Wrestling Federation
Ken Joyce Trophy (1992)

Publications
 If, Brewin Books (co-written childhood autobiography)
 Pat Roach's Birmingham, Brewin Books (2004)

References

External links
 
 BBC Obituary

1937 births
2004 deaths
English male film actors
English male professional wrestlers
English male television actors
People from Bromsgrove
Deaths from esophageal cancer
Deaths from cancer in England
Male actors from Birmingham, West Midlands
20th-century English businesspeople
English judoka